The Casino Goa is a live casino located offshore in Panaji in Goa. The casino is located on a yacht, the M.V. Caravela, anchored in the River Mandovi. The casino vessel worth is 110 million Rupees and is owned by the Advani Pleasure Cruise Co Ltd, a subsidiary of Delta Corp and Casinos Austria. It has around eleven tables of American Roulette, Blackjack and Paplu (Rummy) besides a few electronic slot machines. 

The setup of the casino was controversial as live gambling is outlawed in India. This was partially circumvented by hosting it off the mainland. The government in Goa is promoting offshore goa casino ship by granting new licences to more companies in an attempt to generate more tourist related revenue. Goa state is the only one in India that permits both electronic inland casinos as well as live offshore ones.

In 2021, the company announced that it would be investing 1.5 billion in building a new vessel to replace Caravela.

References

Buildings and structures in Panaji
Casinos in India
Tourist attractions in Panaji